Ner Israel Rabbinical College (ישיבת נר ישראל), also known as NIRC and Ner Yisroel, is a Haredi yeshiva (Jewish educational institution) in Pikesville (Baltimore County), Maryland.  It was founded in 1933 by Rabbi Yaakov Yitzchok Ruderman, a disciple of Rabbi Nosson Tzvi Finkel (the Alter of Slabodka), dean of the Slabodka yeshiva in Lithuania. It is currently headed by Rabbi Aharon Feldman, a disciple of Rabbi Ruderman and a member of the Moetzes Gedolei HaTorah of America.

The yeshiva is an all-male Lithuanian (Litvish)-style Talmudic academy and is politically affiliated with Agudath Israel of America. The yeshiva is composed of three departments: The Mechina for high school students (Mesivta Bochurim), the Yeshiva for post high school students (Beis Medrash Bochurim), and the Kollel for married students (literally translated as "young men"). The graduates of Ner Yisroel are known for their dedication to Torah study and communal leadership.

In 2000, The New York Times described Ner Yisroel as being "unusual in that it has always allowed students access to secular, professional education." However, this takes place off-premises, as university-accredited night-courses.

Although "Ner Israel's mission statement makes clear its priority is religious studies," the yeshiva's alumni have been estimated as 50% rabbis and religious-school teachers, and 50% as professionals: bankers, accountants, physicians, attorneys, psychologists, etc.

History and past leadership
Rabbi Yaakov Yitzchak Ruderman, the son-in-law of Rabbi Sheftel Kramer, founded the yeshiva in 1933 with six students. It was based in a local shul. The yeshiva was named after Rabbi Yisrael Lipkin Salanter, the founder of the mussar movement followed by Rabbi Nosson Tzvi Finkel (known as the Alter of Slabodka), Ruderman's mentor. He modeled Ner Yisroel after Finkel's yeshiva, the Slabodka Yeshiva.

Rabbi Dovid Kronglass, of the Mirrer Yeshiva in Europe (and during World War II in Shanghai) was the yeshiva's first mashgiach ruchani until his death on December 16, 1972. Besides his role as Mashgiach, he also served as a Maggid Shiur and was the Posek of the Yeshiva.

Rabbi Herman Naftali Neuberger, a son-in-law of Rabbi Sheftel Kramer, brother-in-law of Ruderman, and an alumnus of the Mirrer Yeshiva in Europe, and of Ner Israel itself, was president of Ner Israel from 1940 until his death in 2005. Rabbi Neuberger joined the Yeshiva as a student when he arrived from his native Bavaria in 1938.

His son Rabbi Sheftel Neuberger was the menahel (president) of the yeshiva from 2005, when he succeeded his father, until his death on February 10, 2021. Prior to 2005, Sheftel Neuberger was a Maggid Shiur in the yeshiva for many years.

Rabbi Shmuel Yaakov Weinberg, a disciple of Rabbi Yitzchak Hutner, served on the Ner Yisroel faculty for nearly 50 years. He served as a Maggid Shiur from 1945 to 1965, as well as dean of the Kollel from 1953 to 1965. From 1971 until 1987, he served as an assistant to the Rosh Yeshiva and head of the Kollel. From Ruderman's death in 1987 until his own death on July 1, 1999, Weinberg served as Rosh Yeshiva. Weinberg was married to Chana Ruderman, the only child of Yaakov Yitzchok Ruderman. She died on January 23, 2012.

Rabbi Yaakov Moshe Kulefsky, a disciple of Rabbi Shlomo Heiman and senior lecturer in the Yeshiva, served as the Rosh Yeshiva from Weinberg's death in 1999 until his death on November 30, 2000. Other rabbis who served on the faculty include the late: Rabbi Shimon Schwab, later rabbi of the German-Jewish Frankfurt Kehillah / community in Washington Heights N.Y.; Rabbi Simcha Zissel Broide of the Chevron Yeshiva in Jerusalem; Rabbi Ephraim Eisenberg, the son-in-law of Rabbi Mordechai Gifter, and Rabbi Zvi Dov Slanger, a disciple of Rav Shach, who was a Maggid Shiur in the high school for many years until 1996 when he founded and became Rosh Yeshiva of the Bais Medrash & Mesivta Of Baltimore.

Present leadership
The yeshiva is headed by Rabbi Aharon Feldman, who serves as the rosh yeshiva and is also a council member of the Moetzes Gedolei HaTorah. Rabbi Feldman studied in the Yeshiva in the 1950s, but had been living in Israel from 1961 until his appointment as rosh yeshiva in 2001.

Rabbi Boruch Neuberger is the menahel (president) of the Yeshiva, succeeding his father, Rabbi Sheftel Neuberger. Mr. Jerome Kadden is the Yeshiva's executive director. 

Rabbi Beryl Weisbord, a son-in-law of Weinberg, is the yeshiva's mashgiach ruchani. Rabbi Raphael Gold serves as Weisbord's assistant. 

Rabbi Yosef Tendler, a disciple of Rabbi Aharon Kotler, served as the principal of the high school (the Mechina) for almost fifty years from 1964 until his death on February 8, 2012, and Rabbi Simcha Cook (formerly assistant principal) is the current principal of the high school, with Rabbi Yosef Neuberger (son of Rabbi Sheftel Neuberger) filling the position of High School Mashgiach. (The position of assistant principal was changed to Mashgiach upon the death of Rabbi Tendler.) Rabbi Azriel Hauptman (son-in-law of Rabbi Yosef Tendler) is the General Studies principal (replacing Mr. Jacob Schuchman).

Campus
The yeshiva campus is located at Mt. Wilson Lane, just northwest of the Baltimore City limits. The yeshiva moved to its present location in 1968. Their previous location was in Baltimore City at 4411 Garrison Boulevard. The large size of their present campus, which is nearly 100 acres, provides ample space for outdoors recreation.

Ner Israel has two central study halls, one for the high school (known as the Mechina) and one much larger for the beis medrash and the kollel (also doubling as the main prayer sanctuaries). There is an additional study hall/multi-purpose room of a smaller size that is called the "Friedman Beis Medrash". Enrollment is approximately 250 students in its high school division, 300 students in its beis medrash/undergraduate division, and about 200 members in its kollel/postgraduate division.

The dining hall is located in a separate building known as the Sindler/Wolf Dining Hall. The dining hall had a significant expansion and renovation in 2019. There are also three dormitory buildings on campus.

There is faculty housing on campus for members of the faculty and some members of the kollel. This section of the campus is known as "Yeshiva Lane".

The renaissance of the Orthodox Jewish community in Baltimore is closely related to the presence of Ner Yisroel, as many graduates who originate from other regions settled in the community.

Activity outside of Baltimore
In 1959, Rabbi Sholom Gold established a branch of Ner Yisroel in Toronto. In 1964, Rabbi Yaakov Weinberg became the Rosh Yeshiva of Yeshivas Ner Yisroel of Toronto until 1971. This yeshiva still functions but is no longer affiliated with Ner Yisroel in Baltimore.

In recent years, Ner Israel has sent alumni to kollelim across the United States and several have founded their own institutions.

Major student projects include "PROJECT YAHUD", a spring break fund-raising effort for the religious school in Yahud, Israel, and "PROJECT SEED", a summertime outreach effort in smaller communities across America and the world.

Accreditation
Ner Israel is a Maryland state-accredited college through the Association of Advanced Rabbinical and Talmudic Schools – Accreditation Commission (AARTS), and has agreements with Johns Hopkins University, Towson University, Loyola College in Maryland, University of Baltimore, and University of Maryland, Baltimore County allowing undergraduate students to take night courses at these colleges and universities in a variety of academic fields. The agreement also allows the students to receive academic credits for their religious studies. Ner Yisrael also has a pre-med program in association with Stevenson University of Owings Mills.

The Mechina high school is an accredited high school in the state of Maryland under the name "Israel Henry Beren High School". The high school was dedicated by the philanthropic Beren family in memory of Israel Henry Beren who died in 1994.

Curriculum

Cycle of Masechtos (Tractates of the Talmud)
The yeshiva's studies are primarily Talmud texts and relevant rabbinic literature. The yeshiva has a rotating cycle of nine different Talmudic tractates it covers in the course of nine years: Bava Kamma 1, Yevamos, Bava Basra, Gittin, Bava Kamma 2, Nedarim, Bava Metzia, Kiddushin, and Kesubos. There are additional tractates that are sometimes studied in the spring semester. These include Succah, Pesachim, and Makkos. In addition to these B'iyun mesachtos they also learn a range of different mesachtos in Bekius, for example Sotah and Megillah

As is true in many Lithuanian-style Yeshivas, the methodology of the study of the Talmud is based on the Brisker method. Other Lithuanian-style Yeshivos follow almost exclusively the Rabbi Boruch Ber Leibowitz style of the Brisker method. Although Rabbi Lebowitz's works are studied in Ner Yisrael, his specific style of study is not the only approach in Ner Yisroel as Ner Yisroel subscribes to a more eclectic approach of the Brisker method. Hour-long Shiurim (lessons) on Talmud are given daily. The highest level shiur is taught by Rabbi Tzvi Berkowitz.

Additionally, half an hour per day is dedicated to the study of Musar literature.

Kollel Avodas Levi
Kollel Avodas Levi is a department of the Yeshiva that is composed of older students, mostly married, who are engaged in advanced studies. Established in 1959, the Kollel was later named "Avodas Levi" in memory of Rabbi Ruderman who authored a sefer of the same name.  Most of the 250+ members, known as yungerleit, learn within the framework of a study group, called a "chabura", that is focused on a specific topic and led by a senior member of the Kollel. Ner Yisroel confers Semicha (Rabbinic Ordination) upon qualified members.

Rabbi Ezra Neuberger, son of Rabbi Herman became Rosh Kollel/Dean of the Kollel/Graduate school in his father's lifetime.

The Mechina's Masechta Bechina
The Mechina High School studies two tractates every year. One is studied in depth (Iyyun), and the other one is studied in its entirety at a faster pace which is known as the study of Bekius. At the end of the school year, the students take an exam on the entire tractate that was studied in the Bekius program. This exam is called the "Masechta Bechina". An exam on an entire tractate is considered a major accomplishment due to the amount and complexity of the information contained in each tractate. Former students recount how decades later they still have an incredible recall of the tractates that they studied in the Mechina's Bekius program.

Advanced students complete the Iyyun tractate on their own as an extracurricular project. Those that complete the Iyyun tractate are honored at the end of the school year at a special dinner.

STAR-K program
Students of Ner Yisroel's Kollel Avodas Levi have the option to participate in the Star-K Rabbinical Training Program, which prepares them for Kashrus supervision.

Degrees and certificates
Degrees granted by Ner Israel are a Bachelor of Talmudic Law (four years), Master of Talmudic Law (six years), Doctorate in Talmudic Law (ten years and authoring a commentary on Talmudic or Rabbinic texts).

Rabbinic ordination (Semichah) can also be conferred in Ner Yisroel.

Ner Yisroel's Machon program, which began in 1962, trains religious educators for Jewish communities and schools and students earn a Torah Umesorah recognized certification.

Student body
Ner Israel attracts students from the United States, Canada and other countries around the world.

Most undergraduate students in Ner Yisroel will either have already studied in Israel for two or three years prior to their arrival, or plan to upon completion of their studies in Ner Yisroel.

Persian Students
In the 1970s due to the political turmoil following the Iranian Revolution and the outbreak of the Iran-Iraq war, which saw many young Iranian men being sent to the front-lines with little military training, life became a little difficult for Iran's Jews. Rabbi Herman Neuberger was very instrumental in bringing to the United States over 1,000 young Persian men, most of whom studied in Ner Yisroel. Ner Yisroel still maintains a special minyan on Shabbos for Persian students. There are large communities of Orthodox Persian Jews in Baltimore, Los Angeles, and New York that are a direct result of Rabbi Neuberger's efforts.

South American Students
There are many South American students in the Yeshiva. This is primarily due to Camp Or Haner, which is a camp for South Americans that is located in Ner Yisroel. Many of the campers are inspired to remain as students in the Yeshiva. Many of these students return to their communities of origin, which has made a significant impact on the religious observance of members of those communities. The camp was founded by Rabbi Moshe Fuller, who began himself as a South American student of the Yeshiva. Rabbi Fuller died in 2008.

Community service
Students periodically engage in community service such as leading the prayers in the nearby North Oaks retirement community. Additionally, the Yeshiva sends several Rebbeim once a year to spend a Shabbos in the community. This is known as "The Baltimore Shabbos of Chizuk". Additionally, many students visit older members in the community in the nearby Levindale Hebrew Geriatric Center and Hospital on Fridays.

Notable alumni
 Rabbi Shmuel Kamenetsky – rosh yeshiva, Talmudical Yeshiva of Philadelphia, and member of Moetzes Gedolei HaTorah
 Rabbi Aharon Feldman – rosh yeshiva, Yeshivas Ner Israel and member of Moetzes Gedolei HaTorah
Jeff Ballabon – political consultant and community activist
 Rabbi Tzvi Berkowitz – maggid shiur, Yeshivas Ner Israel
 Rabbi Shmuel Bloom - Executive Vice President Emeritus of Agudath Israel of America
 Rabbi Emanuel Feldman – Rabbi Emeritus of Congregation Beth Jacob of Atlanta, Georgia, lecturer
 Rabbi Ilan D. Feldman – Senior Rabbi of Congregation Beth Jacob of Atlanta
 Rabbi Yissocher Frand – maggid shiur and lecturer, Yeshivas Ner Israel
 Rabbi Pinchas Goldschmidt – Chief Rabbi of Moscow
 Rabbi Sam (Shlomo) Kassin - Head of the Shehebar Sephardic Center and Chief Rabbi of the Bukharian Quarter of Jerusalem
 Rabbi Dov Lipman – former Israeli Knesset Member, Yesh Atid
 Rabbi Nota Schiller – Rosh Yeshiva, Ohr Somayach, Jerusalem
 Rabbi Moshe Sherer – former president of Agudath Israel of America
 Rabbi Noach Weinberg – Rosh Yeshiva, Aish HaTorah
 Rabbi Yochanan Zweig – Rosh Yeshiva, Yeshiva Bais Moshe Chaim, Miami
 Hershey Friedman – Canadian billionaire businessman and philanthropist with interests spanning the plastics packaging business and kosher meat in North America to luxury real estate development and Jewish books in Israel.
 Rabbi Nahum Rabinovitch – Rosh Yeshiva, Yeshivat Birkat Moshe
 Aaron Twerski (born 1939) - the Irwin and Jill Cohen Professor of Law at Brooklyn Law School, as well as a former Dean and professor of tort law at Hofstra University School of Law
 Rabbi Idan Scher - Rabbi of Congregation Machzikei Hadas
Rabbi David Bashevkin - American rabbi and professor
Rabbi Dr. Ephraim Wolf - Founding Rabbi of the Great Neck Synagogue and the North Shore Hebrew Academy
Moishe Bane - President of the Orthodox Union

References

External links

 
1933 establishments in Maryland
Baltimore County, Maryland landmarks
Educational institutions established in 1933
Haredi Judaism in the United States
Jewish seminaries
Jews and Judaism in Pikesville, Maryland
Men's universities and colleges in the United States
Orthodox yeshivas in the United States
Private high schools in Maryland
Private schools in Baltimore County, Maryland
Universities and colleges in Baltimore
Yeshivas Ner Yisroel